159th meridian may refer to:

159th  meridian east, a line of longitude east of the Greenwich Meridian
159th meridian west, a line of longitude west of the Greenwich Meridian